Raymond Henry Rowe (born July 28, 1969) is a former American football tight end in the National Football League for the Washington Redskins.  He played college football at San Diego State University and was drafted in the sixth round of the 1992 NFL Draft.

Rowe attended Mira Mesa High School (1984-1987), where he played football and basketball for the Marauders.

References

1969 births
Living people
Spanish players of American football
American football tight ends
Washington Redskins players
San Diego State Aztecs football players